George William Coetzee (born 18 July 1986) is a South African professional golfer. He has won five tournaments on the European Tour and 13 on the Sunshine Tour, where he has also topped the Order of Merit on two occasions.

Early life
Coetzee was born in Pretoria and matriculated from the Afrikaanse Hoër Seunskool in 2004. He started playing golf when he was 10 and won the first junior tournament he ever played in, shooting 49 in 9 holes. He finished 4th and 8th in the Callaway Junior World Championship in San Diego, where he attended the University of San Diego for one semester. He turned professional in 2007.

Professional career
Having turned professional, Coetzee joined the Sunshine Tour in 2007. He claimed his first win during his rookie season, in the Vodacom Origins of Golf Tour event at Selborne. His second and third wins came a year later at the SAA Pro-Am Invitational, and the Vodacom Origins of Golf Tour event at Humewood.

He earned a European Tour card for the 2010 season through the qualifying school, but had to return to qualifying school at the end of the season after finishing 126th on the Order of Merit and recording only two top-10 finishes. Coetzee regained his playing rights in 2011. He had a runner-up placing at the Johnnie Walker Championship at Gleneagles, where he lost out to Thomas Bjorn on the fifth extra hole of a five-man playoff. He also had three third-place finishes at other tournaments and eight top-10s overall. Coetzee finished the season ranked 26th on the Race to Dubai. The following season, 2012, he finished 21st on the Race to Dubai and reached the top 50 of the Official World Golf Ranking.

In February 2014, Coetzee won his maiden European Tour title in his 107th start with a three stroke victory at the Joburg Open. He came from four strokes behind in the final round with a six under par 66 to claim victory. Coetzee won his second European Tour title at the Tshwane Open in March 2015, by a single stroke over Jacques Blaauw. In May 2015, Coetzee won his second tournament of the year at the inaugural AfrAsia Bank Mauritius Open, defeating Thorbjørn Olesen in a sudden-death playoff, at the second extra hole with a birdie on the par-five 18th hole. He won the Sunshine Tour Order of Merit that season.

In February 2016, Coetzee won the Dimension Data Pro-Am finishing birdie-birdie-eagle to defeat Dean Burmester by a single stroke. In July 2017, Alan Burns, who had been Coetzee's caddie since 2010, took another opportunity with another South African golfer Brandon Stone. Coetzee won his second Sunshine Tour Order of Merit title in 2017–18; during the season he won the co-sanctioned Tshwane Open, his fourth European Tour victory. 

In September 2020, Coetzee won his fifth tournament on the European Tour at the Portugal Masters. This was his first win in mainland Europe and his first European Tour win that was not co-sanctioned by the Sunshine Tour.

Professional wins (16)

European Tour wins (5)

1Co-sanctioned by the Sunshine Tour
2Co-sanctioned by the Asian Tour

European Tour playoff record (1–1)

Asian Tour wins (1)

1Co-sanctioned by the European Tour and the Sunshine Tour

Asian Tour playoff record (1–0)

Sunshine Tour wins (14)

1Co-sanctioned by the European Tour
2Co-sanctioned by the Asian Tour

Sunshine Tour playoff record (1–0)

Other wins (1)

Results in major championships
Results not in chronological order in 2020.

CUT = missed the half-way cut
"T" = tied
NT = No tournament due to COVID-19 pandemic

Summary

Most consecutive cuts made – 2 (2013 U.S. Open – 2013 Open Championship)
Longest streak of top-10s – 1

Results in World Golf Championships
Results not in chronological order prior to 2015.

QF, R16, R32, R64 = Round in which player lost in match play
"T" = tied

Team appearances
Professional
World Cup (representing South Africa): 2013, 2016

See also
2009 European Tour Qualifying School graduates
2010 European Tour Qualifying School graduates

References

External links

South African male golfers
Sunshine Tour golfers
European Tour golfers
Afrikaner people
South African people of Dutch descent
Sportspeople from Pretoria
1986 births
Living people